The International Journal of Pediatric Otorhinolaryngology is a peer-reviewed medical journal covering pediatrics and otorhinolaryngology. It was established in 1979 and is published 15 times per year by Elsevier. The founding and current editor-in-chief is Robert J. Ruben (Albert Einstein College of Medicine).  According to the Journal Citation Reports, the journal has a 2015 impact factor of 1.125.

References

External links

Elsevier academic journals
Otorhinolaryngology journals
Pediatrics journals
Publications established in 1979
English-language journals
Journals published between 13 and 25 times per year